Lecabela Dias da Fonseca Quaresma (born 26 December 1989 in Água Grande) is a Portuguese track and field athlete who competes in the 100 metres hurdles and the combined events.

Earlier in her career she represented her birth country, São Tomé and Príncipe. She competed for that country in the 100 m hurdles event at the 2012 Summer Olympics. She was the flag bearer of São Tomé and Príncipe at the opening ceremony.

Competition record

References 

1989 births
Living people
São Tomé and Príncipe female hurdlers
Portuguese heptathletes
Portuguese female hurdlers
Athletes (track and field) at the 2012 Summer Olympics
Olympic athletes of São Tomé and Príncipe
Portuguese female triple jumpers
S.L. Benfica athletes
São Tomé and Príncipe triple jumpers